Stanford Sherock Keglar (born July 4, 1985) is a former American football linebacker who played in the National Football League (NFL). He was drafted by the Tennessee Titans in the fourth round of the 2008 NFL Draft. He played college football at Purdue.

Early years
Stanford Sherock Keglar was born on July 4, 1985 in Indianapolis, Indiana. Playing at Pike High School in Indianapolis, Indiana, he was coached by former Purdue defensive back Ken Coudret. As a junior, he had 72 tackles, four sacks, four fumble recoveries and one interception. During his senior season, Keglar totaled 83 tackles, five sacks, two forced fumbles, two fumble recoveries and one interception. After the season, he was named honorable mention All-State, First-team All County and First-team All-Conference. He was ranked as the eighth best college football prospect in Indiana and the 26th best linebacker by Rivals.com. During his high school years he also participated in track & field as well as swimming and was sectional winner in the 50 freestyle.

College career

2003
Keglar played in only one game as a freshman at Purdue before suffering a high ankle sprain and missing the rest of the season.

2004
During his sophomore year, he started all 12 games. Keglar recorded 61 tackles, three pass breakups, and one forced fumble. Against Notre Dame he had a career high seven tackles.

2005
As a junior, Keglar appeared in 10 games, starting six. He ranked fourth on the team with 50 tackles and added one sack and a pass breakup. On September 17 against Arizona he equaled his career high with seven tackles.

2006
Appearing in all 14 games and starting 10 as a senior at Purdue, Keglar had 69 tackles, five pass breakups, one interception, one forced fumble and a fumble recovery. Keglar broke his career high in tackles with 10 against Ball State. He had a team high nine tackles in the Champs Sports Bowl against Maryland.

Professional career

Tennessee Titans
Keglar was drafted by the Tennessee Titans in the fourth round of the 2008 NFL Draft. He was signed on July 15, 2008. In 13 games as a rookie he totaled 12 tackles. On September 5, 2010, Keglar was waived by the Titans.

Houston Texans
Keglar signed with the Houston Texans on October 25, 2010.  He was cut on September 3, 2011.

Las Vegas Locomotive
Keglar played in three games with the Las Vegas Locomotives of the United Football League in 2012.

Minnesota Vikings
Keglar was signed by the Minnesota Vikings on May 29, 2013. He was cut on June 27, 2013. The Vikings re-signed Keglar again on August 6, 2013 after cutting Nathan Williams. Keglar was again released by the Vikings on August 26, 2013 (along with 12 others) to get to a 75-man roster.

Personal life
Following his NFL career, Keglar has worked in various professions, such as a promoter, in the Las Vegas Metropolitan Area.

References

External links
Purdue Boilermakers bio

1985 births
Living people
American football linebackers
Players of American football from Indianapolis
Purdue Boilermakers football players
Tennessee Titans players
Houston Texans players
Minnesota Vikings players